Koslow is a surname. Notable people with the surname include:

Caren Koslow (died 1992), American murder victim
Howard Koslow (1924–2016), American illustrator
Lauren Koslow (born 1953), American actress

See also
Koslov